Hamlet is a 1959 Australian TV play starring William Job and produced by Royston Morley.

It was one of the first two productions of Shakespeare transmitted by ABC, the other being Anthony and Cleopatra.

Cast 
William Job as Hamlet,
Henry Gilbert as the King,
Georgie Sterling as the Queen,
Owen Weingott as Laertes,
Delia Williams as Ophelia
Gordon Glenwright as the gravedigger
James Lynch as Bernado
Grahame Webb as Francisco
Frank Taylor as Horatio
Vaughan Tracey as Marcellus
Charles McCallum as Voltemand
Geoffrey King as Polonius
John Fegan as Ghost
Maurice Travers as Rosencrantz
James Elliott as Guildenstern
Lou Vernon as the Player King
Dennis Carroll as Player Queen
John Hurrell as Lucianus
Tony Arpino as Norwegian Captain
Geoffrey Hill as Fortinbras
Douglas Hayes as Gravedigger
Charles McCallum as Priest
John Hurrell as Osric
Ria Sohier as attendant
Anne Kelly as attendant
Evelyn Kopfer as attendant
John Brock as attendant
David Bryant as attendant
Kevin Williams as attendant
Graham Webb as attendant
Gary Deacon as attendant

Production
William Job had played Hamlet on stage in Adelaide in 1952. He then went to England and Canada and had only recently returned to Australia, appearing in a TV production of The Seagull. It was Georgie Sterling's third TV appearance after The Multi-Coloured Umbrella and Sorry Wrong Number.

The show used some basic special effects to create the ghosts.

Owen Weingott helped choreograph the fight scene.

The production had a ten-minute intermission.

Reception
The production was well received. The Australian Woman's Weekly called it "two hours of engrossing TV... It was just pleasure and wonderful entertainment. Even if you didn't like Shakespeare, any televiewer would appreciate the notable production and camera work.... A most satisfying night of TV."

A critic from the Sunday Sydney Morning Herald said that it "proved that Shakespeare can be successfully translated to television" with Morley's direction responsible for "much of the credit... he kept the field of action small, relying on _closeups to intensify the drama. I also thought that William Job's portrayal of the young and tragic Dane was outstanding... A night to remember"

A critic from the daily Sydney Morning Herald thought the production suffered from "the skimping of preparation time, the skimping of histrionic talent, and the skimping of imagination and subtlety" although it said Job's performance was one of "sensitiveness, vision and skill".

The critic from The Age thought it was much better than Anthony and Cleopatra.
 
The Bulletin thought the tragedy of the play "shrank  to middle-class size;   Hamlet  was   a   G.P.S.   boy   angry   and hurt   by   what   had   been going on at   home   during   term" but felt "the   production   was  sound   enough—even, in   places, admirable."

It was repeated in 1961 and 1964.

See also
List of live television plays broadcast on Australian Broadcasting Corporation (1950s)

References

External links

1950s Australian television plays
1959 television plays
Films based on Hamlet